Artem Anisimov (born July 27, 1976) is a Russian former professional ice hockey defenseman who played fifteen seasons in the Russian Superleague (RSL) and Vysshaya Liga. Anisimov was drafted in the third round, 62nd overall, of the 1994 NHL Entry Draft by the Philadelphia Flyers. He was also selected in the 2000 NHL Expansion Draft by the Minnesota Wild.

Awards and honors

External links

1976 births
Ak Bars Kazan players
Amur Khabarovsk players
HC Khimik Voskresensk players
Living people
Molot-Prikamye Perm players
Sportspeople from Kazan
Philadelphia Flyers draft picks
Russian ice hockey defencemen
Salavat Yulaev Ufa players